Uncertain Lady is a 1934 American comedy film directed by Karl Freund, written by Daniel Evans, Doris Anderson, Edward A. Curtiss, George O'Neil and Don Ryan, and starring Edward Everett Horton, Genevieve Tobin, Paul Cavanagh, Mary Nash, Renee Gadd and Donald Reed. It was released on April 3, 1934, by Universal Pictures.

Plot

Cast 
Edward Everett Horton as Elliot Crane
Genevieve Tobin as Doris Crane
Paul Cavanagh as Bruce King
Mary Nash as Edith Hayes
Renee Gadd as Myra Spaulding
Donald Reed as Carlos Almirante
Dorothy Peterson as Cicily Prentiss
George Meeker as Dr. Alexander Garrison
Herbert Corthell as Harley
Arthur Hoyt as Superintendent
Gay Seabrook as Secretary
Dick Winslow as Office Boy 
James Durkin as Mr. Weston

References

External links 
 

1934 films
American comedy films
1934 comedy films
Universal Pictures films
Films directed by Karl Freund
American black-and-white films
Films scored by Edward Ward (composer)
1930s English-language films
1930s American films